is a Japanese professional basketball player who plays for Toyota Antelopes of the Women's Japan Basketball League. She also plays for Japan women's national 3x3 team. She brought the U23 national team to a gold medal at the FIBA 3x3 Under-23 World Cup in Lanzhou, and was named the tournament MVP and shoot-out contest gold medalist. This was Japan's very first world title in basketball.

References

External links
Mai Yamamoto - Japan's Up & Coming 3x3 Baller - Mixtape Monday

1999 births
Living people
3x3 basketball players at the 2020 Summer Olympics
Japanese women's 3x3 basketball players
Japanese women's basketball players
Olympic 3x3 basketball players of Japan
Sportspeople from Hiroshima Prefecture